Agawam High School is a public high school in Agawam, Massachusetts. In 2018, enrollment was about 1,250. Minority enrollment was 12 percent. U.S. News ranked the school as silver.

The Brownie is the school mascot and the school colors are brown and orange.

Programs
The school has a marching band. In 2007 the school instituted the EPICS program.

Athletics
The school competes in the Pioneer Valley Interscholastic Athletic Conference. The school's cross country team trains in Robinson State Park.

Jim "Turk" Bruno set the Western Massachusetts scoring record in football during the 1956 season with 174 points. The team won its first AA Conference championship in 1957 and 3 more in the 1960s.

Alumni
Phil McGeoghan, coach and former professional football player
Carl Beane, radio broadcaster
Sergey Nazarov, CEO of Chainlink Labs

See also
List of secondary school sports team names and mascots derived from indigenous peoples

References

External links

Agawam, Massachusetts
High schools in Massachusetts
Schools in Hampden County, Massachusetts